The 2006 FIBA Europe Under-20 Championship Division B was the second edition of the Division B of the FIBA Europe Under-20 Championship, the second-tier level of European Under-20 basketball. The city of Lisbon, in Portugal, hosted the tournament. Georgia won their first title.

Georgia and Macedonia were promoted to Division A.

Teams

Squads

Preliminary round
The sixteen teams were allocated in four groups of four teams each.

Group A

Group B

Group C

Group D

Quarter-final round
The eight top teams were allocated in two groups of four teams each.

Group E

Group F

Classification round
The eight bottom teams were allocated in two groups of four teams each.

Group G

Group H

Knockout stage

13th–16th playoffs

9th–12th playoffs

5th–8th playoffs

Championship

Final standings

Stats leaders

Points

Rebounds

Assists

References
FIBA Europe Archive

FIBA U20 European Championship Division B
2006–07 in European basketball
2006–07 in Portuguese basketball
Sports competitions in Lisbon
International youth basketball competitions hosted by Portugal
July 2006 sports events in Europe
2000s in Lisbon